Salpointe may refer to:

 Jean-Baptiste Salpointe (1825–1898), first Roman Catholic bishop of Arizona
 Salpointe Catholic High School, located in Tucson, Arizona
He eventually became archbishop.